Olive E. Dana (December 24, 1859 – February 3, 1904) was an American author of short-stories, essays, poetry, and sketches. In her literary work, Dana showed her New England heritage. She was born in Augusta, Maine, in 1859, where she always resided. After high school graduation in 1877, she began to write for the press. Except when incapacitated by illness, she was a constant contributor thereafter, both in prose and verse, to many of the literary and religious publications, having published some 300 articles since her literary career began. Her work included articles on home topics and reviews, biographical sketches and short stories. She was a frequent contributor to the columns of the Journal of Education, the Cottage Hearth, Good Housekeeping, Portland Transcript, and Illustrated Christian Weekly. "The Magi", is illustrative of her best poetic ability. Dana died in 1904.

Biography
Olive Eliza Dana was born in Augusta, Maine, December 24, 1859. Her parents were James Wolcott Dana and Sarah W. Savage. She was a direct descendant of Richard Dana, whose name appears upon the records of Cambridge, Massachusetts, in 1640, and who was the founder of a family which contributed in a marked degree to the social, literary, and political advancement of the United States. Patriots, soldiers, preachers, editors, authors, scientists, college presidents and professors bear the name of Dana. The immigrant Dana was of English birth, but it is believed that there was some French ancestry in his family, and this may have given to the Danas some of the characteristics noted in the work of many authors who are French-English. This family also inherited an intellectual brilliance which made them a recognized power in U.S. civic and literary history.

Her great-grandfather, Phineas Dana, a descendant of Joseph Dana, the second son of the original Richard, settled in Oxford, Massachusetts. He married Mehitabel Wolcott, of that town, daughter of Josiah Wolcott and his wife Isabella, daughter of the Rev. John Campbell. This eminent divine, who for 40 years served as pastor of the church at Oxford, Massachusetts, was a native of Scotland and a graduate of Edinburgh University. An early ancestor of Dana's on the maternal side was Major Thomas Savage, who came from England to Boston in 1633. Of this New England line was James Savage, one of the earliest and most prominent settlers of Augusta, Maine. His wife was Eliza Bickford, of Alton, New Hampshire. Sarah W. Savage, the daughter of James and Eliza Bickford Savage, married James Wolcott Dana, and became the mother of Olive E. Dana.

Dana graduated from the Augusta, Maine High School in 1877. That same year, her first published her first article. Her short stories were compiled in the volume, Under Friendly Eaves (1894). Many of her stories were for children and young people. In addition to her abilities as a story-teller, Dana possessed the poet's instinct for interpretation. Her published verses included "The Summons", "Explanation," "For Light," "Shakespeare's Day," and "It Always Comes". They disclosed insight into nature and humanity, and were widely copied. Dana also contributed to the Journal of Education, and other similar publications.

Dana exerted a wide influence in her large circle of friends and among her readers. During the period of 1884–1904, while constantly contributing to the press, she was also interested and active in church, philanthropic and educational movements of the day. She was one of the founders of the Current Events Club of Augusta, serving as president for two years. She was also a member of the Unity Club, and one of her most noted poems, "The Laggard Land", was written for a banquet held at this literary society.

Ill health often interfered with her writing. Dana died at the age of 44 in Augusta, Maine, February 3, 1904, and is interred at the Riverside Cemetery in Augusta.

Selected works

 James T. Fields, 1816-1881., 1887
 Columbus : birthday exercise, 1891
 Thanksgiving Day, 1892
 Alfred Tennsyon. A Memorial Exercise, 1892 
 John Greenleaf Whittier, 1892
 Autumn's Promise, 1892
 Flower-Faith, 1893
 A Roll-Call of Heroes, 1893
 Thankfulness, 1893
 Some April Birthdays, 1893
 Love's Errand, 1893
 Memorable May Days, 1893
 October Birthdays, 1893
 Some September Days, 1893
 Midwinter Birthdays, 1893
 New England's Story, 1893
 The Christmas Hope, 1894
 The Silent Speech, 1894
 New Year's Voices, 1894
 February Birthdays, 1894
 Under Friendly Eaves, 1894
 Decoration Day, 1895
 A Song for September, 1895
 The Way of the Harvest, 1895
 Portland and Its Associations, 1895
 Vacation Clubs, 1895
 A Believer in the Ideal, 1895
 The Christ-Child's Gifts, 1895
 The First Day, 1896
 Abraham Lincoln. An Original Exercise for the Schoolroom, 1896
 The Reapers, 1896
 Arbor Day, 1896
 Her Meaning, 1896
 Abraham Lincoln -- the man and his work : a programme for the twelfth of February, 1897
 Washington and His Friends, 1898
 An Afternoon with the Old Masters, 1898
 Shakespeare's Day.—April 23, 1898
 Songs of Thanksgiving, 1899
 Christmas Joys.—An Exercise, 1899
 Planting the Trees, 1899
 Our Constitution: Its Makers and Its Making, 1907

References

Bibliography

External links
 

1859 births
1904 deaths
19th-century American poets
19th-century American women writers
19th-century American essayists
American short story writers
American women essayists
American women poets
American women short story writers
People from Augusta, Maine
Writers from Maine